The Dr. Amos Holbrook House is a historic house at 203 Adams Street in Milton, Massachusetts, across from Governor Hutchinson's Field.  The two-story wood-frame house was built in 1800 by Dr. Amos Holbrook, a pioneer in the propagation of smallpox inoculations as a means of improving public health.  The house has retained may interior finish details from the Federal period.  It was expanded to the rear in 1872, at which time its front portico was added.  The property also includes a c. 1810 barn.

The house listed on the National Register of Historic Places in 1975, and was included in the Milton Hill Historic District in 1995.

See also
National Register of Historic Places listings in Milton, Massachusetts

References

Houses in Norfolk County, Massachusetts
National Register of Historic Places in Milton, Massachusetts
Milton, Massachusetts
Historic district contributing properties in Massachusetts
Houses on the National Register of Historic Places in Norfolk County, Massachusetts
Federal architecture in Massachusetts
Houses completed in 1800